The Tyrrell 026 was the car with which the Tyrrell Formula One team competed in the 1998 Formula One season, it was the last Tyrrell car to compete in F1.  It was driven by Ricardo Rosset and rookie Toranosuke Takagi.

This was Tyrrell's last year in F1, as Ken Tyrrell had sold the team to British American Racing prior to the first race. Paul Stoddart had almost bought the team prior to BAR's takeover, but the deal was done. Nevertheless, Stoddart's European Aviation sponsored the team and provided transportion during the season.

Tyrrell left the team soon afterward BAR's takeover in anger, after Rosset was chosen to drive alongside Takagi, rather than  Tyrrell driver Jos Verstappen. The car retained the tower sidepod mounted wings introduced by Tyrrell the year before. The wings had been copied by other teams but were banned partway into the season. The team was also disadvantaged by having an over-eager rookie in Takagi, who nevertheless showed flashes of potential, and Rosset, who proved to be too slow.

Ken Tyrrell preferred to retain Verstappen but new team principal Craig Pollock signed Rosset due to his superior sponsorship money. Tyrrell was so incensed at this that he quit the team before the first race. His ire may not have been misplaced as Rosset failed the 107% qualifying cutoff on several occasions, and his performance at Monaco infuriated his mechanics so much that they defaced his paddock scooter, changing the letters in Rosset to spell tosser.

For the first few races, X-wings were used, but they were banned after the San Marino Grand Prix.

The team was unclassified in the Constructors' Championship, with no points but behind Minardi due to the Italian team having a better finishing record.

Current locations
The two Tyrrells raced by Takagi and Rosset are currently owned by Dutchman . He races the cars in the EuroBOSS series.

Paul Stoddart bought most of the team's assets including the 026 chassis, which formed the basis of his Minardi two seater cars.

Complete Formula One results
(key) (results in bold indicate pole position)

References

Tyrrell Formula One cars
1998 Formula One season cars